is a passenger railway station in the city of Kiryū, Gunma, Japan, operated by the private railway operator Jōmō Electric Railway Company.

Lines

Station layout
The station consists of one side platform serving traffic in both directions. There is no station building, but only an open-sided weather shelter next to the platform. The station is unattended.

Adjacent stations

History
Higashi-Nikkawa Station was opened on October 19, 1993.

Passenger statistics
In fiscal 2019, the station was used by an average of 54 passengers daily (boarding passengers only).

Surrounding area
Higashi-Nikkawa Station is located in a suburban residential area.

See also
 List of railway stations in Japan

References

External links

  
	

Stations of Jōmō Electric Railway
Railway stations in Gunma Prefecture
Railway stations in Japan opened in 1993
Kiryū, Gunma